Yolande van der Straten (born 8 May 1965) is a Belgian-Italian backstroke swimmer. She competed at the 1980 Summer Olympics and the 1984 Summer Olympics.

References

External links
 

1965 births
Living people
Belgian female backstroke swimmers
Olympic swimmers of Belgium
Swimmers at the 1980 Summer Olympics
Swimmers at the 1984 Summer Olympics
Italian female backstroke swimmers
Sportspeople from Liège